The Karnataka State Film Awards 2001–02, presented by Government of Karnataka, to felicitate the best of Kannada Cinema released in the year 2001.

Lifetime achievement award

Jury 
A committee headed by U. S. Vadiraj was appointed to evaluate the feature films awards.

Film Awards

Other Awards

References 

Karnataka State Film Awards